Mis•an•thrope is the debut studio album by American nu metal band Ded. It was released on July 21, 2017, produced by John Feldmann and published through Suretone Records. In December 2016, the group published a lyric video for their debut single "FMFY". In February 2017, the ensemble debuted a lyric video for their second single "Anti-Everything", with an official music video produced by Fred Durst released the following month.

Track listing 
Credits adapted from CD and iTunes.

Personnel 
 Joe Cotela – lead vocals
 David Ludlow – guitar, backing vocals
 Matt Reinhard – drums
 Kyle Koelsch – bass guitar, backing vocals

Charts

Album

Singles

References 

2017 debut albums
Ded (band) albums
Albums produced by John Feldmann